The 1956–57 Soviet Championship League season was the 11th season of the Soviet Championship League, the top level of ice hockey in the Soviet Union. 16 teams participated in the league, and Krylya Sovetov Moscow won the championship.

Standings

External links
Season on hockeystars.ru

Soviet
Soviet League seasons
1956–57 in Soviet ice hockey